The Anthem Christmas tree is a Christmas tree erected annually at the Outlets at Anthem, an outlet mall in northern Maricopa County, Arizona, approximately  north of downtown Phoenix. The mall's tree is the tallest Christmas tree in the state of Arizona every year, and is often listed as the tallest Christmas tree in the United States.

Background
The mall has been displaying a tall tree since 2002. At some point during the 2000s, the tree began setting the record for Arizona's tallest fresh-cut Christmas tree, with heights exceeding . In 2010, a  white pine was installed, giving the Anthem tree its first title of tallest fresh-cut Christmas tree in the United States. The marketing director at the mall said in 2012 that the tree draws customers from around the state as well as brings national attention.

Origin and installation

The tree is harvested annually near McCloud, in the Shasta–Trinity National Forest in northern California, from a family-run tree farm. These pine trees do not naturally have live branches on the bottom portion due to the lack of sunlight reaching the ground, therefore the tree does not have the triangular shape of a traditional Christmas tree. The bottom portion of the trunk is shaped with the addition of small trees of the same species, which are used to make artificial branches. These "branches" are attached to the trunk by being grafted into cut notches, filling in the lower part of the tree and creating a more pleasing aesthetic look.

In 2018, 25 saplings were planted to replenish the area from which the tree was harvested. About fifty pine cones from the 2014 tree were used to replant other trees. In some years, there is a "twin" of similar size at the mall's "sister" property, Citadel Outlets in Los Angeles, California.

The tree travels south through Shasta, Sacramento, and Los Angeles before heading into the desert and across the Arizona border on an open flatbed trailer with a banner that reads "Follow me to Outlets at Anthem Largest Tree in Arizona".

Upon arriving in Anthem, the tree is placed in a  well filled with water that keeps the tree from drying out until January.

Lighting ceremony
A crew of ten to twelve people working eight-hour days for several weeks decorate the tree with 5,000 ornaments and bows, and 80 strands of LED Christmas lights that cumulatively measure  in length. The copper star represents Arizona's copper heritage, as the state has mined more copper than any other state since 1907 and was nicknamed "The Copper State" at statehood in 1912.

The installation and decoration begins in late October and a tree-lighting ceremony is held in mid-November. The ceremony includes live music and "holiday treats" at the "family fun night", the highlight of which is the illumination of the tree for the first time. The live entertainment in 2018 included performances by AJ Mitchell and the All-American Boys Chorus from Los Angeles. Country singer Maggie Rose performed in 2015.

The 2019 display includes an interactive light show in which lights on the tree and on the roofline of surrounding buildings are synchronized to music. The nine-minute light show is repeated hourly each night through Christmas Eve.

Tallest tree
The tallest tree in the country in the 1970s and 1980s was at the National Enquirer offices in Palm Beach, Florida, and reached almost  in 1979 when the Guinness Book of World Records listed it as the "World's Largest Decorated Christmas Tree". The Enquirer stopped displaying tall trees after owner Generoso Pope died in 1988.

It has likely been the tallest tree in the nation at times since 1988. From 2010 to 2016, the Anthem tree has been  and is often listed as the tallest tree in the United States, including in 2010, 2012, 2013, 2014, 2015, and 2016.

Statistics

Notes

References

Buildings and structures in Phoenix, Arizona
Christmas in the United States
Individual Christmas trees
Tourist attractions in Phoenix, Arizona